In geometry, a bicone or dicone (from , and Greek: di-, both meaning "two") is the three-dimensional surface of revolution of a rhombus around one of its axes of symmetry. Equivalently, a bicone is the surface created by joining two congruent, right, circular cones at their bases.

A bicone has circular symmetry and orthogonal bilateral symmetry.

Geometry 
For a circular bicone with radius R and height center-to-top H, the formula for volume becomes

For a right circular cone, the surface area is 
   where      is the slant height.

See also
 Sphericon
 Biconical antenna

References

External links 
 

Elementary geometry
Surfaces